Yuxin may refer to:

Places in China
 Yuxin, Hubei (渔薪), a town in Tianmen, Hubei
 Yuxin, Inner Mongolia (育新), a town in Tongliao, Inner Mongolia
 Yuxin, Zhejiang (余新), a town in Jiaxing, Zhejiang
 Yuxin Subdistrict (玉新街道), Haojiang Subdistrict, Shantou, Guangdong
 Yuxin Station (育新站), on Line 8 of the Beijing Subway

People
 Xie Yuxin (谢育新), a Chinese footballer
 Liu Yuxin (刘雨欣), a Chinese actress and model

Companies
 Yuxin, a Chinese speedcube manufacturing company.